Giffone (Calabrian:  or ) is a comune (municipality) in the Province of Reggio Calabria in the Italian region Calabria, located about  southwest of Catanzaro and about  northeast of Reggio Calabria.

Geography
Giffone borders the following municipalities: Anoia, Cinquefrondi, Galatro, Mammola, Maropati.

Demographic evolution

References

External links

Cities and towns in Calabria